A Private Dinner was an 1897 French short silent film by Georges Méliès. It was sold by Méliès's Star Film Company and is numbered 127 in its catalogues.

The film is one of a small group of risqué "mature subjects" (i.e. stag films) Méliès made around this time; others included Peeping Tom at the Seaside, A Hypnotist at Work, and After the Ball. A Private Dinner is currently presumed lost.

References

External links
 

French black-and-white films
Films directed by Georges Méliès
French silent short films
Lost French films
1890s lost films
1897 short films
1890s French films